Ivan Ivanovich Mezhlauk (30 September 1891 – 25 April 1938) was a Soviet politician and statesman who was the first first secretary of the Communist Party of the Turkmen SSR as well as its first president.

Ivan Mezhlauk was born in Kharkiv (modern Ukraine), in the Kharkov Governorate of the Russian Empire on 30 September 1891. He was of Latvian ethnicity. He joined the Bolshevik Party in 1918 and served in the Red Army during the Russian Civil War. He was president from 19 November 1924 until September 1925, when he was replaced by Halmurad Sahatmuradov. His term as first secretary lasted longer, until 1926.

He was succeeded as first secretary by Shaymardan Ibragimov.

From 1930 to 1933, Mezhlauk worked in the Soviet economic planning apparatus, for a time as the secretary of the Council of Labor and Defense.

Mezhlauk was the older brother of the Soviet economic planner, Valery Mezhlauk, the head of Gosplan from 1934 to 1937. Both brothers were arrested during the Great Purge of 1937-1938 and were among those who were executed. Ivan Mezhlauk was arrested on 3 December 1937, sentenced to death on 25 April 1938 and shot the same day.

Footnotes

External links
World Statesmen
Rulers of Soviet Republics

1891 births
1938 deaths
Politicians from Kharkiv
People from Kharkov Governorate
National University of Kharkiv alumni
Bolsheviks
Soviet military personnel of the Russian Civil War
Communist Party of Turkmenistan politicians
Party leaders of the Soviet Union
All-Russian Central Executive Committee members
Central Executive Committee of the Soviet Union members
Latvian people executed by the Soviet Union
Great Purge victims from Ukraine
Soviet rehabilitations
People from the Russian Empire of German descent
Ukrainian people of Latvian descent
Ukrainian people of German descent
Soviet people of German descent